Everson Arantes de Oliveira, better known as Alemão, is a Brazilian footballer who last played for Esporte Clube Santo André in the Campeonato Brasileiro Série C.

Biography
Alemão played for Paulista State Division club Clube Atlético Juventus, deployed mainly as a right defender.

On 15 May 2008, he was signed by Adelaide United as a replacement for retiring club legend Richie Alagich. In round 9 of the 2008–09 A-League season he scored his first goal for Adelaide in the 2–1 win over Perth Glory in the process taking Adelaide to the top of the league table.

In January, 2009, Alemao scored his second goal for the club after coming off the bench against Sydney FC. He was released from Adelaide after their 2010 AFC Champions League campaign after they were knocked out of the round of 16.

On 27 May 2011, it was announced Alemão had joined Santo André of Série C in Brazil.

Career statistics
(Correct as of 17 February 2010)

1 - includes A-League final series statistics
2 - includes FIFA Club World Cup statistics; AFC Champions League statistics are included in season commencing after group stages (i.e. 2008 ACL in 2008–09 A-League season etc.)

Honours
With Cruzeiro Youth Team:
 Campeonato Mineiro de Juniores: 3x

References

External links
 Adelaide United profile
 CBF profile

1982 births
Living people
Brazilian footballers
Association football defenders
Cruzeiro Esporte Clube players
Guarani FC players
Esporte Clube Juventude players
Clube Atlético Juventus players
Adelaide United FC players
Esporte Clube Santo André players
Campeonato Brasileiro Série A players
Campeonato Brasileiro Série B players
A-League Men players
Campeonato Brasileiro Série C players
Brazilian expatriate footballers
Brazilian expatriate sportspeople in Australia
Expatriate soccer players in Australia
People from Ituverava